Sri Hartati (born 8 November 1984) is an Indonesian powerlifter. She won seven gold medals at the World Championships. In 2018, she broke the world record. The record that Sri Hartati made was a total lift of 565 kg.

Career
Sri Hartati started her career by training at the Padepokan Gajah Lampung, this is a place for powerlifting and weightlifting athletes who will compete in national and international championships.

References

1984 births
Living people
People from Pringsewu Regency
Indonesian powerlifters